The 2000 Giro del Trentino was the 24th edition of the Tour of the Alps cycle race and was held on 24 April to 27 April 2000. The race started in Sillian and finished in Arco di Trento. The race was won by Simone Borgheresi.

General classification

References

2000
2000 in road cycling
2000 in Italian sport